The Isaaq (also Ishaak, Isaac) is an ethnic group in Somaliland. It is one of the major tribes in the Horn of Africa, with a large and densely populated traditional territories.

The Isaaq people trace their lineage back to Sheikh Ishaaq bin Ahmed, an Arab Islamic scholar who purportedly traveled to Somaliland in the 12th or 13th century and married into the local Dir clan, though this story is probably legendary.

Overview

Somali genealogical tradition places the origin of the Isaaq tribe in the 12th or 13th century with the arrival of the legendary Sheikh Ishaaq Bin Ahmed (Sheikh Ishaaq) from Arabia. Sheikh Ishaaq purportedly settled in the coastal town of Maydh in modern-day northeastern Somaliland, where he married into the local Magaadle clan. Some modern Arabic hagiographies also claim that Sheikh Ishaaq was a descendant of Ali ibn Abi Talib, the cousin and son-in-law of the prophet Muhammad. This Alid lineage was most likely invented to enhance the clan-family's prestige and to stress its proper Muslim background.

There are also numerous existing hagiographies in Arabic which describe Sheikh Ishaaq's travels, works and overall life in modern Somaliland, as well as his movements in Arabia before his arrival. Besides historical sources, one of the more recent printed biographies of Sheikh Ishaaq is the Amjaad of Sheikh Husseen bin Ahmed Darwiish al-Isaaqi as-Soomaali, which was printed in Aden in 1955.

Sheikh Ishaaq's tomb is in Maydh, and is the scene of frequent pilgrimages. Sheikh Ishaaq's mawlid (birthday) is also celebrated every Thursday with a public reading of his manaaqib (a collection of glorious deeds). His Siyaara or pilgrimage is performed annually both within Somaliland and in the diaspora particularly in the Middle East among Isaaq expatriates.

The dialect of the Somali language that the Isaaq speak has the highest prestige of any other Somali dialect.

Distribution

The Isaaq have a very wide and densely populated traditional territory and make up 80% of Somaliland's population, and live in all of its six regions (Awdal, Marodi Jeh, Togdheer, Sahil, Sanaag and Sool). The Isaaq have large settlements in the Somali Region of Ethiopia, mainly on the eastern side of Somali Region also known as the Hawd and formerly Reserve Area which is mainly inhabited by the Isaaq residents. They also have large settlements in Naivasha, Kenya, where the Ishaakia make up a large percentage of the Kenyan population, and in Djibouti, where the Isaaq is the fourth largest group after the Issa, the Afar, and the Gadabuursi, accounting for 20% of Djibouti's population.

The Isaaq tribe are the largest group in Somaliland. The populations of five major cities in Somaliland – Hargeisa, Burao, Berbera, Erigavo and Gabiley – are all predominantly Isaaq. They exclusively dominate the Marodi Jeh region, and the Togdheer region, and form a majority of the population inhabiting the western and central areas of Sanaag region, including the regional capital Erigavo. The Isaaq also have a large presence in the western and northern parts of Sool region as well, with Habr Je'lo sub-clan of Isaaq living in the Aynabo district whilst the Habr Yunis subclan of Garhajis lives in the eastern part of Xudun district and the very western part of Las Anod district. They also live in the northeast of the Awdal region, with Saad Muse sub-clan being centered around Lughaya and its environs.

The populations of five major cities in Somaliland – Hargeisa, Burao, Berbera, Erigavo and Gabiley – are predominantly Isaaq.

History

Medieval 
The Isaaq played a prominent role in the Ethiopian-Adal War (1529–1543, referred to as the "Conquest of Abyssinia") in the army of Ahmad ibn Ibrahim al-Ghazi, I. M. Lewis noted that only the Habr Magadle division (Ayoub, Garhajis, Habr Awal and Arap) of the Isaaq were mentioned in chronicles of that war written by Shihab Al-Din Ahmad Al-Gizany known as Futuh Al Habash.

I. M. Lewis states: The Marrehan and the Habr Magadle [Magādi] also play a very prominent role (...) The text refers to two Ahmads's with the nickname 'Left-handed'. One is regularly presented as 'Ahmad Guray, the Somali' (...) identified as Ahmad Guray Xuseyn, chief of the Habr Magadle. Another reference, however, appears to link the Habr Magadle with the Marrehan. The other Ahmad is simply referred to as 'Imam Ahmad' or simply the 'Imam'.This Ahmad is not qualified by the adjective Somali (...) The two Ahmad's have been conflated into one figure, the heroic Ahmed Guray (...)

Early modern 

Long after the collapse of the Adal Sultanate, the Isaaq established successor states, the Isaaq Sultanate and the Habr Yunis Sultanate. These two Sultanates possessed some of the organs and trappings of a traditional integrated state: a functioning bureaucracy, regular taxation in the form of livestock, as well as an army (chiefly consisting of mounted light cavalry). These sultanates also maintained written records of their activities, which still exist. The Isaaq Sultanate ruled parts of the Horn of Africa during the 18th and 19th centuries and spanned the territories of the Isaaq clan in modern day Somaliland and Ethiopia. The sultanate was governed by the Rer Guled branch of the Eidagale clan and is the pre-colonial predecessor to the modern Republic of Somaliland.

The modern Guled Dynasty of the Isaaq Sultanate was established in the middle of the 18th century by Sultan Guled of the Eidagale line of the Garhajis clan. His coronation took place after the victorious battle of Lafaruug in which his father, a religious mullah Abdi Eisa successfully led the Isaaq in battle and defeated the Absame tribes near Berbera where a century earlier the Isaaq clan expanded into. After witnessing his leadership and courage, the Isaaq chiefs recognized his father Abdi who refused the position instead relegating the title to his underage son Guled while the father acted as the regent till the son come of age. Guled was crowned the as the first Sultan of the Isaaq clan in July 1750. Sultan Guled thus ruled the Isaaq up until his death in 1839, where he was succeeded by his eldest son Farah full brother of Yuusuf and Du'ale, all from Guled's fourth wife Ambaro Me'ad Gadid.

By the early 1880s the Isaaq Sultanate had been reduced to the Ciidangale confederation with the Eidagale, Arap and Ishaaq Arreh subclan of the Habr Yunis remaining. In 1884–1886 the British signed treaties with the coastal subclans and had not yet penetrated the interior in any significant way. Sultan Deria Hassan remained de facto master of Hargeisa and it's environs.

Modern

Dervish movement 
The Isaaq also played a major role in the Dervish movement, with Sultan Nur Aman of the Habr Yunis being fundamental in the inception of the movement. Sultan Nur was the principle agitator that rallied the dervish behind his anti-French Catholic Mission campaign that would become the cause of the dervish uprise. Haji Sudi of the Habr Je'lo was the highest ranking Dervish after Mohammed Abdullah Hassan, he died valiantly defending the Taleh fort during the RAF bombing campaign. The Isaaq tribes most well-known for joining the Dervish movement were from the eastern tribes such as the Habr Yunis and Habr Je'lo. These two sub-tribes were able to purchase advanced weapons and successfully resist both British Empire and Ethiopian Empire for many years. The fourth Isaaq Grand Sultan Deria Hassan exchanged letters with Muhammad Abdullah Hassan in the first year of the movement's foundation, with the sultan inciting an insurrection in Hargeisa in 1900 as well as supplying the Mullah with vital information.

Post-colonial 
The Isaaq people along with other northern Somali tribes were under British Somaliland protectorate administration from 1884 to 1960. On gaining independence, the Somaliland protectorate decided to form a union with Italian Somalia. The Isaaq clan spearheaded the greater Somalia quest from 1960 to 1991.

The Isaaq played a massive role to push for unification and independence. They selected to join the Trust Territory of Somaliland to form the Somali Republic. During the civilian government from 1960 to 1969, they held dominant positions. Jama Mohamed Ghalib (1960-4) and Ahmed Mohamed Obsiye (1964-6), both belonging to the Isaaq clan, served as the president of the National Assembly, while a notable Isaaq member named Muhammad Haji Ibrahim Egal served as the Prime Minister of Somalia from 1967-9. Furthermore, when English became one of the official languages, the ministries of Foreign Trade, Foreign Affairs, Education, and Information were mainly held by the Isaaq members. They were still powerful in the early years of the military dictatorship (1969–91). However, from the late 1970s, Marehan became politically powerful under the leadership of the military dictator Siad Barre. The Isaaq began to face political and economic marginalization and in response, they organized the Somali National Movement to over his regime. Thus the Somaliland War of Independence began and this struggle movement forced the Isaaq clan to become a victim to a genocidal campaign by Siad Barre's troops (which also included armed Somali refugees from Ethiopia); the death toll has been estimated to be between 50,000 and 250,000. After the collapse of the Somali Democratic Republic in 1991 the Isaaq-dominated Somaliland declared independence from Somalia as a separate nation.

Mercantilism
Historically (and presently to a degree), the wider Isaaq clan were relatively more disposed to trade than their tribal counterparts due in part to their centuries old trade links with the Arabian Peninsula. In view of this imbalance in mercantile experience, other major Somali clans tended to resort to tribal slang terms such as "iidoor", an enviable pejorative roughly meaning trader/exchanger:

Somalis bandied about numerous stereotypes of clan behavior that mirrored these emerging social inequalities. The pejorative slang terms iidoor or kabadhe iidoora (loosely meaning "exchange") reflect Somali disdain for the go-between, the person who amasses wealth through persistence and mercantile skills without firm commitments to anyone else. As the Isaaq became more international and cosmopolitan, their commercial success and achievement ideology aroused suspicion and jealousy, notably among rural Darod who disliked Isaaq self-confidence and made them the target of stereotypes.

The Habr Awal clan of the Isaaq have a rich mercantile history largely due to their possession of the major Somali port of Berbera, which was the chief port and settlement of Habr Awal clan during the early modern period. The clan had strong ties to the Emirate of Harar and Emirs would hold Habr Awal merchants in their court with high esteem with Richard Burton noting their influence in Emir Ahmad III ibn Abu Bakr's court and discussions with the Vizier Mohammed. The Habr Awal merchants had extensive trade relations with Arab and Indian merchants from Arabia and the Indian subcontinent respectively, and also conducted trade missions on their own vessels to the Arabian ports. Berbera, in addition to Berbera being described as “the freest port in the world, and the most important trading place on the whole Arabian Gulf, was also the main marketplace in the entire Somali seaboard for various goods procured from the interior, such as livestock, coffee, frankincense, myrrh, acacia gum, saffron, feathers, wax, ghee, hide (skin), gold and ivory.

The Habr Je'lo clan of the Isaaq derived a large supply of frankincense from the trees south in the mountains near port town of Heis. This trade was lucrative and with gum and skins being traded in high quantity, Arab and Indian merchants would visit Habr Je'lo ports early in the season to get these goods cheaper than at Berbera or Zeyla before continuing westwards along the Somali coast. Heis, in addition to being a leading exporter of tanned skins also exported a large quantity of skins and sheep to Aden as well as imported a significant amount of goods from both the Arabian coast and western Somali ports, reaching nearly 2 million rupees by 1903. The Habr Je’lo coastal settlements and ports, stretching from near Siyara in the west to Heis (Xiis) in the east, were important to trade and communication with the Somali interior, with Kurrum (Karin), the principle Habr Je’lo port, being a major market for livestock and frankincense procured from the interior, and was a favorite for livestock traders due to the close proximity of the port to Aden.

Starting in the middle of the 19th century, Isaaq clans became more connected to the European commercial world as historic ties between southern Somali towns along the Benadir coast with India and Oman were being reoriented southward toward Zanzibar. Isaaq trade and migration patterns were skewed by British imperial control of Aden more toward Europe and colonies like India, Egypt, and the Sudan, enabling the Isaaq to maintain a variety of contacts across the British Empire. The Isaaq clan-family became the first Somalis to actually reside abroad, in western Europe or its colonial outposts, where they socialized in two different cultures.

The Isaaq affinity for mercantilism was not lost on the sole president and dictator of the Somali Democratic Republic (1969–1991), Siad Barre, who disliked the Isaaq clan-family due to their financial independence, thus making it harder to control them:

Siyaad had a deep and personal dislike for the clan. The real reasons can only be guessed at, but in part it was due to his inability to control them. As accomplished business operatives, they had built a society that was not dependant on government largesse. The Isaaq had traditional trade relationships with the nations of the Arabian Peninsula that continued despite the attempts of the government to center all economic activity in Mogadishu. Siyaad did what he could, however, and Isaaq traders were forced to make the long trip to Mogadishu for permits and licenses.

Nevertheless, in the 1970s and 1980s, nearly all of the livestock exports went out through the port of Berbera via Isaaq livestock traders, with the towns of Burao and Yirowe in the interior being home to the largest livestock markets in the Horn of Africa. The entire livestock exports accounted to upwards of 90% of the Somali Republic's entire export figures in a given year, and Berbera's exports alone provided over 75% of the nation's recorded foreign currency income at the time.

Isaaq ethnic group

In the Isaaq ethnic group, component tribes are divided into two uterine divisions, as shown in the genealogy. The first division is between those lineages descended from sons of Sheikh Ishaaq by a Harari woman – the Habr Habuusheed – and those descended from sons of Sheikh Ishaaq by a Somali woman of the Magaadle sub-tribe of the Dir – the Habr Magaadle. Indeed, most of the largest subtribes of the tribal-ethnic group are in fact uterine alliances hence the matronymic "Habr" which in archaic Somali means "mother". This is illustrated in the following clan structure.

A. Habr Magaadle
 Ismail (Garhajis) 
 Ayub
 Muhammad (Arap)
 Abdirahman (Habr Awal)

B. Habr Habuusheed
 Ahmed (Tol Je’lo)
 Muuse (Habr Je'lo)
 Ibrahiim (Sanbuur)
 Muhammad (‘Ibraan)

One tradition maintains that Sheikh Ishaaq had twin sons: Muhammad (Arap), and Ismail (Garhajis).

There is clear agreement on the tribe and sub-tribe structures that has not changed for a long time. The oldest recorded genealogy of a Somali in Western literature was by Sir Richard Burton in the mid–19th century regarding his Isaaq (Habr Yunis) host and the governor of Zeila, Sharmarke Ali Saleh

The following listing is taken from the World Bank's Conflict in Somalia: Drivers and Dynamics from 2005 and the United Kingdom's Home Office publication, Somalia Assessment 2001.

Isaaq 
Habr Awal
Sa'ad Musa
Issa Musa
Garhajis
Habr Yunis
Eidagale
Arap
Ayub
Habr Je'lo
Muuse Abokor
Mohamed Abokor
Samane Abokor
Tol Je'lo
Sanbuur
Imraan

Stereotypes among the Isaaq subtribes go a long way to explaining each subtribes role in Somaliland. In one exemplified folklore tale, Sheikh Ishaaq's three eldest sons split their father's inheritance among themselves. Garhajis receives his imama, a symbol of leadership; Awal receives the sheikh's wealth; and Ahmed (Tolja'ele) inherits his sword. The story is intended to depict the Garhajis's proclivity for politics, the Habr Awal's mercantile prowess, and the Habr Je'lo's bellicosity.

To strengthen these tribal stereotypes, historical anecdotes have been used: The Garhajis were dominant leaders before and during the colonial period, and thus acquired intellectual and political superiority; Habr Awal dominance of the trade via Djibouti and Berbera is practically uncontested; and Habr Je’lo military prowess is cited in accounts of previous conflicts.

Notable figures

Royalty and rulers 
Deria Hassan, 4th Grand Sultan of the Isaaq
Abdillahi Deria, 5th Grand Sultan of the Isaaq
Guled Abdi, 1st Grand Sultan of the Isaaq
Hassan Farah, 3rd Grand Sultan of Isaaq
Awad Deria, 5th Sultan of the Habr Yunis
Deria Sugulleh Ainashe, 2nd Sultan of the Habr Yunis
Hersi Aman, 3rd Sultan of the Habr Yunis
Sharmarke Ali Saleh, major trader and governor of Berbera, Zeila and Tadjoura
Farah Guled, 2nd Grand Sultan of the Isaaq
Sultan Mohamed Sultan Farah - Sultan of the Arap clan and commander of the SNM's 10th division
Sultan Abdulrahman Deria, Sultan of the Habr Awal clan
Sultan Abdillahi Deria, prominent anti-colonial figure and 5th Grand Sultan of the Isaaq
Mahamed Abdiqadir – 8th Grand Sultan of the Isaaq
Madar Hersi, 7th Sultan of the Habr Yunis Sultanate
Daud Mahamed, 9th and current Grand Sultan of the Isaaq
Sultan Osman Sultan Ali Koshin, the current Grand sultan of the Issa Musse clans

Sugulle Ainanshe, 1st Sultan of the Habr Yunis

Politicians 

Ahmed Mohamed Mohamoud, Former President of Somaliland from June 2010 to December 2017, fourth and longest-serving Chairman of the Somali National Movement, and former Chairman of the Kulmiye Party
Muse Bihi Abdi, current president of Somaliland
Abdirahman Ahmed Ali Tuur, last Somali National Movement chairman and First President of Somaliland
Abdirahman Mohamed Abdullahi, Speaker of the House of Representatives of Somaliland and the Chairman of Wadani political party
Ahmed Yusuf Yasin, was the Vice-President of Somaliland from 2002 until 2010. and the second chairman of UDUB party.
Abdurrahman Mahmoud Aidiid, former mayor of Hargeisa, the capital of the Somaliland
Abdikarim Ahmed Mooge, current mayor of Hargeisa
Ali Abdi Farah, Former Minister of Communication and Culture in Djibouti
Ali Ismail Yacqub - First Minister of Defence for the Somali Republic
Abdirahim Abbey Farah, former United Nations Under-Secretary General
Umar Arteh Ghalib, former Prime Minister of Somalia 1991–1993. Brought Somalia into the Arab League in 1974 during his term Foreign Minister of Somalia from 1969 to 1977. Former president of UN Security Council, teacher and poet
Hussein Arab Isse, the Minister of Defence and the Deputy Prime Minister of Somalia from 20 July 2011 to 4 November 2012
Ismail Mahmud Hurre, foreign minister of the Transitional Federal Government of Somalia from mid-2006 to early 2007
Ismail Ali Abokor, former Vice-President of the Somali Democratic Republic
Faysal Ali Warabe, Chairman of the For Justice and Development party of Somaliland (UCID).
Fowsiyo Yusuf Haji Adan, former Foreign Minister of Somalia and MP in Federal Parliament
Muhammad Haji Ibrahim Egal, former Prime Minister of Somalia July 1960, July 1967– November 1969; former President of Somaliland from May 1993 to May 2002.
Mohamed Abdullahi Omaar, former Foreign Minister of Somalia
Mohamed Omar Arte, former Deputy Prime Minister of Somalia.
Abdishakur Iddin, current mayor of Berbera
Abdirisaq Ibrahim Abdi, current mayor of Burao
Jama Mohamed Ghalib, former Police Commissioner of the Somali Democratic Republic, Secretary of Interior, Minister of Labor and Social Affairs, Minister of Local Government and Rural Development, Minister of Transportation, and Minister of Interior.
Osman Dubbe – Minister of Information, Culture and Tourism of Somalia
Mohamed Ainanshe Guled, vice president of the Somali Democratic Republic
Muhammad Hawadle Madar, former Prime Minister of Somalia from 3 September 1990 to 24 January 1991
Ismail Ali Abokor – Vice President of the Somali Democratic Republic 1971-1982
Abdilahi Husein Iman Darawal -  Somaliland politician and former SNM commander
Abdullahi Abdi Omar "Jawaan" - Somaliland politician and introducer of the National emblem of Somaliland
Mohamed Abdullahi Omaar, served twice as the Foreign Minister of Somalia.
Osman Jama Ali - Prime Minister of Somalia under the Transitional National Government
Salah Ahmed Jama - Current Deputy Prime Minister of the Federal Government of Somalia

Poets 
Hadrawi, poet and philosopher; author of Halkaraan; also known as the "Somali Shakespeare"
Hussein Hasan - legendary warrior and poet and was the grandson of the 1st Isaaq Sultan Guled Abdi
Salaan Carrabey – legendary poet
Farah Nur, a famous warrior, poet and sultan of the Arap subclan
Elmi Boodhari, legendary and beloved poet and pioneer for many Somali poetry/music genres, specifically romance and is dubbed the "King of Romance".
Mohamed Hashi Dhamac (Gaarriye), legendary Somali poet and political activist
Abdillahi Suldaan Mohammed Timacade, known as 'Timacade', a famous poet during the pre- and post-colonial periods
Kite Fiqi – legendary Habr Je'lo warrior and poet
Hussein Hasan – famous poet and warrior
Yusuf Shaacir - well-known Somali poet
Aden Ahmed Dube of the Isaaq, Habr-Yonis tribe, great poems aroused envy in Raage Ugaz, and infrequently, bloody wars and irreconcilable enmity.
Mohammed Liban from the Isaaq tribe of Habr Awal, was an eloquent and witty improviser, and even better known under the name of Mohammed Liban Giader.
Aden Ahmed Dube "Gabay Xoog" circa 1821 –1916, poet.
Abdiwaasa' Hasan Ali Araale Guleid, wellknown poet
Abdi Iidan Farah, 20th century Somali poet who wrote about Somali independence and camels

Economists 
Abdul Majid Hussein, Economist, Former Permanent Representative of Ethiopia to the United Nations, 2001–2004. Leader of Ethiopian Somali Democratic League (ESDL) party in the Somali Region of Ethiopia from 1995 to 2001
Jamal Ali Hussein, Somali Politician and Economists expert. He was former presidential candidate of Somaliland UCID party
Dr. Saad Ali Shire, British-Somali politician, agronomist and economist, who is currently serving as the Minister of Finance of Somaliland. Shire formerly served as the Foreign Minister of Somaliland. He also served as the Minister of Planning and National Development of Somaliland.

Military leaders and personnel 
Mohamed Dalmar Yusuf Ali, more commonly known as "Mohamed Ali", high-ranking commander of the WSLF and SNM
Deria Hassan, fourth Grand Sultan of Isaaq, recognised for being a wise and astute leader.
Mohamed Kahin Ahmed, high-ranking SNM commander and current Minister of Interior of Somaliland
Guled Haji, wise sage and commander of the Habr Yunis
Mohamed Hasan Abdullahi, former Chief of Staff of the Somaliland Armed Forces
Ibrahim Boghol, high ranking commander of the Dervish movement
Nuh Ismail Tani, current Chief of Staff of the Somaliland Armed Forces
Mohamed Hashi Lihle - Colonel of the SNA and later the commander of the military wing of the Somali National Movement
Mohamed Bullaleh - Prominent 20th Century tribal chief and commander of the Hagoogane raid that destroyed Dervish movement

Writers and musicians 
Abdullahi Qarshe, Somali musician, poet and playwright; known as the "Father of Somali music"
Ali Feiruz, popular musician in Djibouti, Somaliland and Somalia
Mohamed Mooge Liibaan, highly renowned Somali instrumentalist and vocalist.
Ahmed Mooge Liibaan, prominent Somali instrumentalist and vocalist
Nadifa Mohamed – Somali novelist. Winner of the 2010 Betty Trask Prize
Chunkz – English YouTuber, musician, host and entertainer
Ahmed Gacayte – famous Somali singer, songwriter and composer
Sahra Halgan, Somali singer and cultural activist
Shamis Abokor Ismail (Guduudo Carwo), Somali singer

Scholars 
Musa Haji Ismail Galal, a Somali writer, scholar, linguist, historian and polymath
Abdillahi Diiriye Guled - Literary scholar and discoverer of the Somali prosodic system
Jama Musse Jama, prominent Somali ethnomathematician and author
Hussein Mohammed Adam (Tanzania) - foremost Somali intellectual and scholar who founded the Somali Studies International Association (SSIA)

Religious leaders and scholars 
Sheikh Bashir, Somali religious leader who waged the 1945 Sheikh Bashir Rebellion
Sheikh Madar – head of Qadiriyya tariqa and influential figure in the early growth and expansion of Hargeisa
Abdallah Shihiri, senior advisor to the Mullah of the Dervish movement
Deria Arale, senior advisor to the Mullah of the Dervish movement
Haji Sudi, one of the founders of the Somali Dervish movement
Sheikh Mohamed Sheikh Omar Dirir - Prominent religious scholar and businessman
Sultan Nur Ahmed Aman, Sultan of the Habr Yunis and one of the founders of the Somali Dervish movement
Ridwan Hirsi Mohamed – Former Deputy Prime Minister of Somalia and Former Minister of Religious Affairs of Somalia

Entrepreneurs 
Abdirashid Duale, Somali entrepreneur and the CEO of Dahabshiil
Amina Moghe Hersi (b. 1963), Award-winning Somali entrepreneur who has launched several multimillion-dollar projects in Kampala, Uganda
Ismail Ahmed, owner and CEO of WorldRemit which is one of the fastest growing money transfer company in the world and he's considered 7th most influential man in Britain.
Mahmood Hussein Mattan, Somali former merchant seaman who was wrongfully convicted of the murder of Lily Volpert on 6 March 1952
Ibrahim Dheere, considered to be the first Somali billionaire and richest Somali person in the world with an estimated net worth of 1.8 billion US Dollars.
Mohammed Abdillahi Kahin 'Ogsadey', Somali business tycoon based in Ethiopia, where he established MAO Harar Horse, the first African corporation to export coffee and amassed a net worth of approximately $3 Billion Ethiopian Birr.

Activists 
Edna Adan Ismail, first female Foreign Minister of Somaliland, has been called "The Muslim Mother Teresa" for her charity work and activism for women and girls
Michael Mariano – legendary Somali politician, lawyer and key figure in independence struggle and Somali Youth League
Farah Omar – anti-colonial ideologue and founder of the first Somali Association
Hassan Isse Jama, one of the founding fathers of the SNM in London, former deputy chairman of SNM, first vice president of Somaliland.
Hassan Adan Wadadid- One of the original founders of the Somali National Movement and served as the movement's first Vice-Chairman.
Hanan Ibrahim, gender activist and first Somali British to be awarded Member of British Empire (MBE) for community work in UK
Nimco Ali, British social activist
Magid Magid – Somali-British activist and politician who served as the Lord Mayor of Sheffield from May 2018 to May 2019

Athletes 
Mo Farah, British 4 time Olympic gold medalist and the most decorated athlete in British athletics history.
Mohammed Ahmed, Somali-Canadian long-distance runner and Olympian
Mohammed Ahamed, Norwegian-Somalian association footballer currently playing in the Tippeligaen for Tromsø IL. He plays as a Center Forward
Mohammed Ahmed, Canadian long-distance runner
Bashir Abdi, Somali-Belgian athlete
Sheikh Hamse - notorious Somali football player

Journalists 
Ahmed Hassan Awke, Somali journalist and broadcaster, veteran of the BBC World Service, the Voice of America, Somaliland National TV, Horn Cable Television, Radio Mogadishu and Universal TV, former presidential spokesman of Siad Barre during his military junta.
Rageh Omaar, Somali-British journalist and writer. He used to be a BBC world affairs correspondent, In September 2006, he moved to a new post at Al Jazeera English, and as of 2017 is currently with ITV News
Mona Kosar Abdi – news anchor for ABC's Good Morning America

Other 
Hussain Bisad, is one of the tallest men in the world, at 2.32 m (7 ft 7 1⁄2 in). He has the largest hand span of anyone alive
Sada Mire, Swedish-Somali archaeologist, art historian and presenter
Abdi Haybe Lambad, famous Somali stand-up comedian
Buurmadow – well known clan elder
Hussein Mohammed Adam "Tanzania", Somali professor, journalist and documentary maker
Sooraan, famous actor and comedian

References

Somali clans
Somali clans in Ethiopia
Issa Musa